The E.I.S. Men's Volleyball squad is a high school volleyball team  based in San Pedro Sula, Honduras. It plays in the AASCA and ABSH without interruption since 2000. The team has won the AASCA Volleyball Tournament four times, the North Regional Tournament twice in the last two years and the ABSH Volleyball Championship three times for the graduating class of 2011. The name cheered during national and international competitions is Inter, and Bulldogs.

History
This historic squad was formed by four legends that got united to form a volleyball team. The next year other four players joined the forces to fight for the common cause of a championship. The other members joined later and it all went down in history of their two AASCA Volleyball Tournament wins. Some of the players were acquired through trades and free agency moves which will be discussed later but no transaction was as sneaky and backstabbing as LeBron James' taking his talents to South Beach.

Nicknames
The nicknames is one of the most important aspects of this team, and is one of the main reasons this team is like a family. Every player and coach has a unique and personal nickname that is constantly used when making reference of him. The nicknames have been acquired through experiences of several players, as pranks also known as trokos, and by likeliness to another person or animal.

Season 2010-2011

Final standing 2011

Final four

Bracket

Final standing 2010

Final four

Bracket

Final standing 2010

Final four

Bracket

National
Sport in Honduras